Kanka may refer to:

Kanka, Uzbekistan, an ancient settlement
Kanka (name), given name and surname
Kank-A, a liquid pharmaceutical product used primarily to treat canker sores

See also 
 Khanka (disambiguation)